Kalkūni is the biggest village and the administrative centre of Kalkūne Parish in Augšdaugava Municipality in the Selonia region of Latvia. From 2009 until 2021, it was part of the former Daugavpils Municipality.

External links 
Kalkūne Parish Council
Satellite map at Maplandia.com

Towns and villages in Latvia
Augšdaugava Municipality
Illuxt County
Selonia